Thaanumella cookei is a species of salt marsh snail with an operculum, an aquatic gastropod mollusk in the family Assimineidae. This species is endemic to Micronesia.

References

 WoRMS info on this species

Fauna of Micronesia
Thaanumella
Gastropods described in 1946
Taxonomy articles created by Polbot